The Rungstedlund Award is an award of honor, founded by the Rungstedlund Foundation (Rungstedlundfonden) in 1991. The DKK 25,000 prize is annually handed  to a person who has made a notable contribution in an area which interested Karen Blixen. The prize is handed at the birthday of Karen Blixen on 17 April. The award comes from a gift from Hørsholm Municipality at the opening of the Karen Blixen Museum on 14 May 1991.

Rungstedlund was the country house in Rungsted near Copenhagen which was owned by Karen Blixen from 1939-58. Rungstedlund is  now the site of the  Karen Blixen Museum.

Recipients of the Rungstedlund Award

References

External links 
 List of recipients of Rungstedlund Award on Litteraturpriser.dk
Karen Blixen Museum website
Danish literary awards
Karen Blixen